The 1995 Vuelta a Burgos was the 17th edition of the Vuelta a Burgos road cycling stage race, which was held from 7 August to 10 August 1995. The race started and finished in Burgos. The race was won by Laurent Dufaux of the  team.

General classification

References

Further reading

Vuelta a Burgos
1995 in road cycling
1995 in Spanish sport